= Master D. M. L. =

German painter

Master D. M. L. is an unidentified German painter of the Renaissance period.

The name assigned to him is derived from the artists insignia D. M. L. on a portrait of Martin Luther. The artist is said to be a follower of Lucas Cranach the Elder from the 16th or 17th century, and was interpreting portrait types as invented by Cranach. Besides the Luther portrait, a portrait of Philipp Melanchthon by the anonymous artist is also known.
